A by-election was held for the New South Wales Legislative Assembly electorate of Yass on 5 March 1913 because of the resignation of Niels Nielsen. Nielsen was the Secretary for Lands in the McGowen ministry, and  drafted legislation to repeal the Land Conversion Act consistent with Labor policy, however this proved to be controversial, with extensive division in the Labor Party, resulting in Bill Dunn and Henry Hoyle resigning from parliament in July 1911, removing Labor's slim majority in the Legislative Assembly. Caucus dropped his legislation and Nielsen resigned from the ministry on 1 August 1911. Unable to regain ministerial office, he resigned his seat in 1913 as part of a party deal that saw him appointed Mew South Wales trade commissioner in San Fancisco.

Dates

Result

Niels Nielsen resigned.

See also
Electoral results for the district of Yass
List of New South Wales state by-elections

Notes

References

1913 elections in Australia
New South Wales state by-elections
1910s in New South Wales